St. Lunaire-Griquet is a town in the Canadian province of Newfoundland and Labrador. The town is located near the northern tip of the Great Northern Peninsula of Newfoundland. The town had a population of 603 in the Canada 2021 Census.

History
French fishermen began fishing the region in the 16th century. However, St. Lunaire bay was not mapped until 1784 by the French sailor Liberge de Granchain. An island in the mouth of St. Lunaire bay still bears his namesake. Evidence of ancient French fishing activity in this bay can be still observed in the remains of old French bread ovens on Granchain Island.
The name may be from Saint-Lunaire in Brittany, named after Saint Leonorus.

Demographics 

Culture and sights
St. Monica's Church is a wooden Roman Catholic church with a small flèche instead of a spire. It is opposite the Town Hall on Main Street. A Memorial depicting strong community leaders and developers with colourful models of ships and lighthouses were erected on Main Street as well.

The Wild Berry Economusée on route 436 is the world's only museum dedicated to the interpretation of wild berries.
The town also includes a small hotel which is convenient for visitors of L'Anse aux Meadows. There is a lookout that provides a great view of the entire town and the ocean. The access to the lookout is a wooden staircase that is located just behind the school off of main street. 
During the month of July visitors can observe icebergs making their way towards Newfoundland shores as the town is one of the most Northern locations of "Ice Berg Alley".

St. Lunaire-Griquet is amongst the few remaining areas that culturally seal hunt out of necessity for many of its residents. It is one of the northernmost points on the island of Newfoundland, birthed as a fishing community and remains highly influenced as such to this day.

St. Lunaire-Griquet is 10 km from UNESCO World Heritage site of L'Anse aux Meadows.

See also
 List of cities and towns in Newfoundland and Labrador

References

Towns in Newfoundland and Labrador